Lewis Rudin (April 4, 1927 – September 20, 2001) was an American real estate investor and developer. Along with his older brother Jack Rudin, he presided over a family empire of 40 buildings valued at $2bn including more than 3,500 apartments in 22 buildings in New York City. Rudin was a founder of NADAP, a private nonprofit social services organization that serves residents in need of the New York City metropolitan area. Rudin also contributed to efforts to rescue New York City from imminent bankruptcy during the 1975 New York City fiscal crisis.

Biography
Born to a Jewish family in The Bronx to May (née Cohen) and Samuel Rudin, he graduated from DeWitt Clinton High School in 1944, and the New York University School of Commerce after serving as a sergeant in the Army during World War II. Along with his brother he joined the family real estate holding, Rudin Management Company, which had been founded by his grandfather Louis Rudinsky, a Polish-Jewish immigrant, who initially worked as a grocer  before establishing the family's real estate business in the 1920s. In the 1950s and 1960s, the Rudin family was one of the most prolific builders of skyscrapers in Manhattan. In 1975, after the death of his father, Lewis and his brother Jack took over the family company. Jack focused on construction and operations while Lewis focused on financing and marketing. In 1990, the Rudin Management portfolio was valued at $1.5 billion.

His sons, Eric and William succeeded him. William C. Rudin also became chairman of the Association for a Better New York, founded by his father in 1971. In 2014, he was elected chairman of The Real Estate Roundtable, of which he was a founding member.

The Rudin Center for Transportation Policy & Management at the Robert F. Wagner Graduate School of Public Service is to honor his financial gift to New York University.

Personal life
Rudin was married three times. His first wife was Gladyce Largever. They had two children, Beth Rudin DeWoody (b. 1952) and William Rudin. His ex-wife Gladys remarried to film executive David Begelman. His second wife was Wilhelmina model Basha Szymanska. His third wife and widow was Rachel (Weingarten) Rudin.

References

Further reading
Seymour P. Lachman, Mr. New York: Lew Rudin and His Love for the City (SUNY Press, 2014)

1927 births
2001 deaths
Businesspeople from New York City
American people of Polish-Jewish descent
New York University Stern School of Business alumni
American real estate businesspeople
Rudin family
DeWitt Clinton High School alumni